Kill Bill: Volume 1 is a 2003 American martial arts film written and directed by Quentin Tarantino. It stars Uma Thurman as the Bride, who swears revenge on a team of assassins (Lucy Liu, Michael Madsen, Daryl Hannah, and Vivica A. Fox) and their leader, Bill (David Carradine), after they try to kill her. Her journey takes her to Tokyo, where she battles the yakuza.

Tarantino conceived Kill Bill as an homage to the 1973 film Lady Snowblood, grindhouse cinema, martial arts films, samurai cinema, blaxploitation and spaghetti Westerns. It features an anime sequence by Production I.G. Volume 1 is the first of two Kill Bill films made in a single production. They were planned as a single release, which Tarantino split into two films to avoid having to cut scenes. Volume 2 was released six months later.

Kill Bill was theatrically released in the United States on October 10, 2003. It received positive reviews and grossed over $180 million worldwide on a $30 million budget, achieving the highest-grossing opening weekend of a Tarantino film to that point.

Plot 
In 1999, a pregnant woman in a wedding dress, the Bride, lies wounded in a chapel in El Paso, Texas. She tells her attacker, Bill, that the baby is his just as he shoots her in the head.

Years later, the Bride, having survived the attack, goes to the home of Vernita Green, planning to kill her. Both women were members of the Deadly Vipers, a now-disbanded group of assassins led by Bill. Vernita now leads a normal suburban family life. The women engage in a knife fight, which is interrupted for the benefit of Vernita's young daughter Nikki, just before she arrives home from school. The Bride agrees to meet Vernita at night to settle the matter, but when Vernita tries to shoot the Bride with a pistol hidden in a box of cereal, the Bride throws a knife into Vernita's chest, killing her. After the Bride pulls the knife out of Vernita's chest, Nikki sees her mother's lifeless body. The Bride expresses regret at what Nikki has seen but insists that Vernita deserved it. She offers Nikki a chance to avenge her mother's death when she grows up, should she choose to do so.

Years earlier, the cops investigate the massacre at the wedding chapel. The sheriff discovers that the Bride is alive but comatose. In the hospital, Deadly Viper Elle Driver prepares to assassinate the Bride via lethal injection, but Bill aborts the mission at the last moment. Although Elle vehemently disagrees, Bill considers it dishonorable to kill the defenseless Bride. Awakening from her coma, the Bride is horrified to find that she is no longer pregnant. She first kills a man who intends to rape her while she is unconscious, then a hospital worker who has raped her and has been selling her body while she was comatose. She takes the hospital worker's truck and teaches herself to walk again. Resolving to kill Bill and the other Deadly Vipers, the Bride picks her first target: O-Ren Ishii, now the leader of the Tokyo yakuza.

After witnessing the yakuza murder her parents when she was a child, O-Ren took vengeance on the yakuza boss and replaced him after training as an elite assassin. The Bride travels to Okinawa, Japan, to obtain a sword from legendary swordsmith Hattori Hanzō, who has sworn never to forge a sword again. After learning that her target is Bill, his former student, he relents and spends a month crafting his finest sword for her. The Bride tracks O-Ren to the House of Blue Leaves, a Tokyo restaurant, and publicly amputates the arm of her assistant, Sofie Fatale. She defeats the Crazy 88, O-Ren's squad of elite fighters, and kills her bodyguard, schoolgirl Gogo Yubari. O-Ren and the Bride duel in the restaurant's Japanese garden; the Bride kills O-Ren by slicing off the top of her head. After torturing Sofie for information about Bill and the other Deadly Vipers, the Bride leaves her alive as a threat before going to kill Vernita. Bill finds Sofie and asks her if the Bride knows that her daughter is alive.

Cast 

 Uma Thurman as the Bride (code name Black Mamba), a former member of the Deadly Viper Assassination Squad, described as "the deadliest woman in the world". She seeks revenge on the Deadly Vipers after they try to kill her and her unborn child in a wedding chapel.
She and the Bride once had a close friendship. She is the Bride's first target.
He is the final target of the Bride's revenge. He is an unseen character until Volume 2.
She is the Bride's second target.
He is the Bride's third target.
She is also Bill’s new lover. Driver is based on Madeline (Christina Lindberg) in They Call Her One Eye.
She is also a former protégée of Bill's, and was present at the wedding chapel massacre.
 Michael Parks as Ranger Earl McGraw, a Texas Ranger who investigates the wedding chapel massacre. Parks originated McGraw in the Robert Rodriguez film From Dusk till Dawn, which Tarantino wrote and acted in. He would go on to reprise the role in both segments of the Rodriguez/Tarantino collaboration Grindhouse. Parks also appeared in Volume 2 as a separate character, Esteban Vihaio.
 Jun Kunimura as Boss Tanaka, a yakuza whom O-Ren executes after he ridicules her ethnicity and gender.
 Kenji Ohba as Shiro, Hattori Hanzo's employee.
 Kazuki Kitamura as Boss Koji, a yakuza working for O-Ren. He also appeared as Bodyguard #2 in O-Ren's army, the Crazy 88. 
 James Parks as Ranger Edgar McGraw, a Texas Ranger and son of Earl McGraw.
 Jonathan Loughran as Buck's trucker client, killed by the Bride after he attempts to rape her.
 Yuki Kazamatsuri as the Proprietress of the House of Blue Leaves.
 Sakichi Sato as "Charlie Brown", a House of Blue Leaves employee who is mocked by the Crazy 88, as he wears a kimono similar to the shirt worn by the Peanuts character.
 Ambrosia Kelley as Nikki Bell, Vernita's four-year-old daughter. She witnesses the Bride killing her mother, and the Bride suggests that she seek revenge when she gets older, if she still "feel[s] raw about it".
 The 5.6.7.8's (Sachiko Fuji, Yoshiko Yamaguchi and Ronnie Yoshiko Fujiyama) as themselves, performing at the House of Blue Leaves.
 Yōji Tanaka as Crazy 88 #3
 Issey Takahashi as Crazy 88 #4
 Juri Manase as Crazy 88 #6
 Akaji Maro as Boss Ozawah
 Ai Maeda as O-Ren (anime sequence) (voice)
 Naomi Kusumi as Boss Matsumoto (anime sequence) (voice)
 Hikaru Midorikawa as Pretty Riki (anime sequence) (voice)

Production

Writing 

Quentin Tarantino and Thurman conceived the Bride character during the production of Tarantino's 1994 film Pulp Fiction; Kill Bill credits the story to "Q & U". Tarantino spent a year and a half writing the script while he was living in New York City in 2000 and 2001, spending time with Thurman and her newborn daughter Maya. Reuniting with the more mature Thurman, now a mother, influenced the way Tarantino wrote the Bride character; he did not come to the realization that the Bride's child could still be alive until the end of the writing process.

He originally wrote Bill for Warren Beatty, but as the character developed and the role required greater screen time and martial arts training, he rewrote it for David Carradine. Tarantino also considered Bruce Willis for the role of Bill. Tarantino decided to cast Daryl Hannah as Elle Driver after seeing her performance in the television film First Target. The physical similarities between Thurman and Hannah inspired how he wrote the rivalry between the characters.

An early draft included a chapter set after the confrontation with Vernita in which the Bride has a gunfight with Gogo Yubari's vengeful sister Yuki. It was cut because it would have made the film overlong and added $1 million to the budget. Another draft featured a scene in which the Bride's car is blown up by Elle.

Filming 

When Thurman became pregnant as shooting was ready to begin, Tarantino delayed the production, saying: "If Josef Von Sternberg is getting ready to make Morocco and Marlene Dietrich gets pregnant, he waits for Dietrich!" Although the scenes are presented out of chronological order, the film was shot in sequence. The choreographer Yuen Woo-Ping, whose previous credits include The Matrix, was the film's martial arts advisor. The anime sequence, covering O-Ren Ishii's backstory, was directed by Kazuto Nakazawa and produced by Production I.G, which had produced films including Ghost in the Shell and Blood: The Last Vampire. The combined production lasted 155 days and had a budget of $55 million.

According to Tarantino, the most difficult part of making the film was "trying to take myself to a different place as a filmmaker and throw my hat in the ring with other great action directors", as opposed to the dialogue scenes he was known for. The House of Blue Leaves sequence, in which the Bride battles dozens of yakuza soldiers, took eight weeks to film, six weeks over schedule. Tarantino wanted to create "one of the greatest, most exciting sequences in the history of cinema". The crew eschewed computer-generated imagery in favor of practical effects used in 1970s Chinese cinema, particularly by the director Chang Cheh, including the use of fire extinguishers and condoms to create spurts and explosions of blood. Tarantino told his crew: "Let's pretend we're little kids and we're making a Super 8 movie in our back yard, and you don't have all this shit. How would you achieve this effect? Ingenuity is important here!"

Car crash 
Near the end of filming, Thurman was injured in a crash while filming the scene in which she drives to Bill. According to Thurman, she was uncomfortable driving the car and asked a stunt driver to do it; Tarantino assured her that the car and road were safe. She lost control of the car and hit a tree, suffering a concussion and damage to her knees.

According to Thurman, Miramax would only give her the crash footage if she signed a document "releasing them of any consequences of [Thurman's] future pain and suffering". Tarantino was apologetic, but his and Thurman’s relationship became bitter for years afterwards. Thurman said that after the car crash she "went from being a creative contributor and performer to being like a broken tool". Miramax released the footage in 2018 after Thurman went to police following the accusations of sexual abuse by Weinstein.

Editing 
Kill Bill was planned and filmed as a single film. After editing began, the producer, Harvey Weinstein, who was known for pressuring filmmakers to shorten their films, suggested that Tarantino split the film in two. This meant Tarantino did not have to cut scenes, such as the anime sequence. Tarantino told IGN: "I'm talking about scenes that are some of the best scenes in the movie, but in this hurdling pace where you're trying to tell only one story, that would have been the stuff that would have had to go. But to me, that's kind of what the movie was, are these little detours and these little grace notes." The decision to split the film was announced in July 2003.

Music 

As with Tarantino's previous films, Kill Bill features a diverse soundtrack; genres include country music and Spaghetti Western scores by Ennio Morricone. Bernard Herrmann's theme from the film Twisted Nerve is whistled by the menacing Elle Driver in the hospital scene. A brief, 15-second excerpt from the opening of the Ironside theme music by Quincy Jones is used as the Bride's revenge motif, which flares up with a red-tinged flashback whenever she is in the company of her next target. Instrumental tracks from Japanese guitarist Tomoyasu Hotei figure prominently, and after the success of Kill Bill they were frequently used in American TV commercials and at sporting events. As the Bride enters "The House of Blue Leaves", go-go group the 5,6,7,8's perform "I Walk Like Jayne Mansfield," "I'm Blue (The Gong-Gong Song)" and "Woo Hoo". The connection to Lady Snowblood is further established by the use of "The Flower of Carnage" the closing theme from that film. James Last's "The Lonely Shepherd" by pan flute virtuoso Gheorghe Zamfir plays over the closing credits. The theme from The Green Hornet plays when the Bride is flying to and arriving in Japan.

Influences 

Kill Bill was inspired by grindhouse films that played in cheap US theaters in the 1970s, including martial arts films, samurai cinema, blaxploitation films, and spaghetti westerns. It pays homage to the Shaw Brothers Studio, known for its martial arts films, with the inclusion of the ShawScope logo in its opening titles and the "crashing zoom", a fast zoom usually ending in a close-up commonly used in Shaw Brothers films. The Kinji Fukasaku Battles Without Honor and Humanity series main soundtrack theme, particularly its reinterpretation in the 2000 film, was utilized heavily in the film.

The Bride's yellow tracksuit, helmet and motorcycle resemble those used by Bruce Lee in the 1972 martial arts film Game of Death. The animated sequence pays homage to violent anime films such as Golgo 13: The Professional (1983) and Wicked City (1987)

The Guardian wrote that Kill Bills plot shares similarities with the 1973 Japanese film Lady Snowblood, in which a woman kills off the gang who murdered her family, and observed that like how Lady Snowblood used stills and illustration for "parts of the narrative that were too expensive to film", Kill Bill similarly used "Japanese-style animation to break up the narrative". The plot also resembles the 1968 French film The Bride Wore Black, in which a bride seeks revenge on five gang members and strikes them off a list as she kills them.

Release

Theatrical release 

It was the first Tarantino film in six years, following Jackie Brown in 1997. Paul Dergarabedian, president of Exhibitor Relations, said Volume 1s opening weekend gross was significant for a "very genre specific and very violent" film that in the United States was restricted to theatergoers 17 years old and up. It ranked first at the box office, beating School of Rock (in its second weekend) and Intolerable Cruelty (in its first). Volume 1 had the widest theatrical release and highest-grossing opening weekend of a Tarantino film to date; Jackie Brown and Pulp Fiction (1994) had each grossed  on their opening weekends. According to the studio, exit polls showed that 90% of the audience was interested in seeing the second Kill Bill after seeing the first.

The film outperformed its main competitor Intolerable Cruelty in Norway, Denmark and Finland, though it ranked second in Italy. Volume 1 had a record opening in Japan, though expectations were higher due to the film being partially set there and because of its homages to Japanese martial arts cinema. It had "a muted entry" in the United Kingdom and Germany due to its 18 certificate, but "experienced acceptable drops" after its opening weekend in the two territories.

Home media 

In the United States, Volume 1 was released on DVD and VHS on April 13, 2004, the week Volume 2 was released in theaters. In a December 2005 interview, Tarantino addressed the lack of a special edition DVD for Kill Bill by stating "I've been holding off because I've been working on it for so long that I just wanted a year off from Kill Bill and then I'll do the big supplementary DVD package." After one week of release, the film's DVD sales had surpassed its  US box office gross.

The United States does not have a DVD boxed set of Kill Bill, though box sets of the two separate volumes are available in other countries, such as France, Japan and the United Kingdom. Upon the DVD release of Volume 2 in the US, however, Best Buy did offer an exclusive box set slipcase to house the two individual releases together. Volume 1, along with Volume 2, was released in High Definition on Blu-ray on September 9, 2008, in the United States. As of March 2012, Volume 1 sold 141,456 Blu-ray units in the US, grossing $1,477,791.

Reception 
On review aggregator Rotten Tomatoes, Kill Bill: Volume 1 has a score of 85% based on reviews from 238 critics; the average rating is 7.70/10. Its consensus reads: "Kill Bill is admittedly little more than a stylish revenge thriller – albeit one that benefits from a wildly inventive surfeit of style." At Metacritic, which assigns a weighted average score 69 out of 100 based on 43 reviews from mainstream critics, indicating "generally favorable reviews". Audiences polled by CinemaScore gave the film an average grade of "B+" on an A+ to F scale.

A. O. Scott of The New York Times wrote:

Manohla Dargis of the Los Angeles Times called Kill Bill: Volume 1 a "blood-soaked valentine to movies. ... It's apparent that Tarantino is striving for more than an off-the-rack mash note or a pastiche of golden oldies. It is, rather, his homage to movies shot in celluloid and wide, wide, wide, wide screen — an ode to the time right before movies were radically secularized." She also recognized Tarantino's technical talent, but thought the film's appeal was too limited to popular culture references, calling its story "the least interesting part of the whole equation". Roger Ebert of the Chicago Sun-Times gave it 4 out of 4, describing Tarantino as "effortlessly and brilliantly in command of his technique". He wrote: "The movie is not about anything at all except the skill and humor of its making. It's kind of brilliant."

Cultural historian Maud Lavin states that the Bride's embodiment of revenge taps into viewers' personal fantasies of committing violence. For audiences, particularly women viewers, the character provides a complex site for identification with one's own aggression.

Accolades 
Uma Thurman received a Golden Globe Best Actress nomination in 2004. She was also nominated in 2004 for a BAFTA Award for Best Actress in a Leading Role, in addition with four other BAFTA nominations. Kill Bill: Volume 1 was placed in Empire Magazine's list of the 500 Greatest Films of All Time at number 325 and the Bride was also ranked number 66 in Empire magazine's "100 Greatest Movie Characters". Neither Kill Bill movie received any Academy Awards (Oscars) nominations.

Sequel
A sequel, Kill Bill: Volume 2, was released in April 2004. It continues the Bride's quest to kill Bill and the remaining members of the Deadly Viper Assassination Squad. Volume 2 was also a critical and commercial success, earning over $150 million.

Legacy 
Kill Buljo is a 2007 Norwegian parody of Kill Bill set in Finnmark, Norway, and portrays Jompa Tormann's hunt for Tampa and Papa Buljo. The film satirizes stereotypes of Norway's Sami population. According to the Norwegian newspaper Dagbladet, Tarantino approved of the parody. The Pussy Wagon vehicle from Kill Bill: Volume 1 made a cameo in the 2010 music video for Lady Gaga's song "Telephone" at Tarantino's behest.

References

External links 

 
 
 
 
 

2003 action films
2003 films
A Band Apart films
American action films
American films with live action and animation
American splatter films
2000s feminist films
American films about revenge
Films about secret societies
Films directed by Quentin Tarantino
Films produced by Lawrence Bender
Films scored by RZA
Films set in Mexico
Films set in Okinawa Prefecture
Films set in Texas
Films set in Tokyo
Films shot in Austin, Texas
Films shot in Beijing
Films shot in China
Films shot in Hong Kong
Films shot in Los Angeles
Films shot in Mexico
Films shot in Tokyo
Girls with guns films
Kill Bill
Kung fu films
American martial arts films
American nonlinear narrative films
American rape and revenge films
Samurai films
Films with screenplays by Quentin Tarantino
American vigilante films
Yakuza films
Miramax films
2003 martial arts films
Miramax franchises
American neo-noir films
2000s vigilante films
Japan in non-Japanese culture
American crossover films
2000s English-language films
2000s American films